Saint Vincent may refer to:

People

Saints
 Vincent of Saragossa (died 304), a.k.a. Vincent the Deacon, deacon and martyr
 Saint Vincenca, 3rd century Roman martyress, whose relics are in Blato, Croatia
 Vincent, Orontius, and Victor (died 305), martyrs who evangelized in the Pyrenees
 Saint Vincent of Digne (died 379), French bishop of Digne
 Vincent of Lérins (died 445), Church father, Gallic author of early Christian writings
 Vincent Madelgarius (died 677), Benedictine monk who established two monasteries in France
 Vincent Ferrer (1350–1419), Valencian Dominican missionary and logician
 Vincent de Paul (1581–1660), Catholic priest who served the poor
 Vicente Liem de la Paz (Vincent Liem Nguyen, 1732–1773), Vincent Duong, Vincent Tuong, and Vincent Yen Do of the Vietnamese Martyrs
 Vincent Pallotti (1795–1850), Italian ecclesiastic
 Vincenzo, Martyr of Craco (died 286), said to have been one of the Theban Legion

Others
 John Jervis, 1st Earl of St Vincent  (1735–1823), British commander at Battle of Cape St. Vincent (1797), later First Lord of the Admiralty
 St. Vincent (musician) (born 1982), stage name for Annie Clark, American multi-instrumentalist, singer, and songwriter
 Saint Vincent (musician) (born 1976), French musician who created the industrial black metal band Blacklodge

Places
 Saint Vincent and the Grenadines, a sovereign state in the Caribbean Sea, often known simply as Saint Vincent
 Saint Vincent (Antilles), the main island of Saint Vincent and the Grenadines
 Cape St. Vincent, a peninsula in southern Portugal

Canada 
Saint-Vincent-de-Paul, Quebec, a borough in Laval, Quebec
St. Vincent Township, Ontario, a former township, now part of Meaford, Ontario
St. Vincent, Alberta, a village located near the town of Saint Paul in the province of Alberta
Saint-Vincent River, a river in Quebec

France 
 Saint-Vincent, Haute-Garonne, in the Haute-Garonne département
 Saint-Vincent, Haute-Loire, in the Haute-Loire département
 Saint-Vincent, Puy-de-Dôme, in the Puy-de-Dôme département
 Saint-Vincent, Pyrénées-Atlantiques, in the Pyrénées-Atlantiques département
 Saint-Vincent, Tarn-et-Garonne, in the Tarn-et-Garonne département
 Saint-Vincent-Bragny, in the Saône-et-Loire département
 Saint-Vincent-Cramesnil, in the Seine-Maritime département
 Saint-Vincent-de-Barbeyrargues, in the Hérault département
 Saint-Vincent-de-Barrès, in the Ardèche département
 Saint-Vincent-de-Boisset, in the Loire département
 Saint-Vincent-de-Connezac, in the Dordogne département
 Saint-Vincent-de-Cosse, in the Dordogne département
 Saint-Vincent-de-Durfort, in the Ardèche département
 Saint-Vincent-de-Lamontjoie, in the Lot-et-Garonne département
 Saint-Vincent-de-Mercuze, in the Isère département
 Saint-Vincent-de-Paul, Gironde, in the Gironde département
 Saint-Vincent-de-Paul, Landes, in the Landes département
 Saint-Vincent-de-Pertignas, in the Gironde département
 Saint-Vincent-de-Reins, in the Rhône département
 Saint-Vincent-de-Salers, in the Cantal département
 Saint-Vincent-des-Bois, in the Eure département
 Saint-Vincent-des-Landes, in the Loire-Atlantique département
 Saint-Vincent-des-Prés, Saône-et-Loire, in the Saône-et-Loire département
 Saint-Vincent-des-Prés, Sarthe, in the Sarthe département
 Saint-Vincent-de-Tyrosse, in the Landes département
 Saint-Vincent-d'Olargues, in the Hérault département
 Saint-Vincent-du-Boulay, in the Eure département
 Saint-Vincent-du-Lorouër, in the Sarthe département
 Saint-Vincent-du-Pendit, in the Lot département
 Saint-Vincent-en-Bresse, in the Saône-et-Loire département
 Saint-Vincent-Jalmoutiers, in the Dordogne département
 Saint-Vincent-la-Châtre, in the Deux-Sèvres département
 Saint-Vincent-la-Commanderie, in the Drôme département
 Saint-Vincent-le-Paluel, in the Dordogne département
 Saint-Vincent-les-Forts, in the Alpes-de-Haute-Provence département
 Saint-Vincent-Lespinasse, in the Tarn-et-Garonne département
 Saint-Vincent-Rive-d'Olt, in the Lot département
 Saint-Vincent-Sterlanges, in the Vendée département
 Saint-Vincent-sur-Graon, in the Vendée département
 Saint-Vincent-sur-Jabron, in the Alpes-de-Haute-Provence département
 Saint-Vincent-sur-Jard, in the Vendée département
 Saint-Vincent-sur-l'Isle, in the Dordogne département
 Saint-Vincent-sur-Oust, in the Morbihan département
 Jonquières-Saint-Vincent, in the Gard département

Italy 
 Saint-Vincent, Aosta Valley

United States 
 Saint Vincent, California, an unincorporated community in Marin County
 St. Vincent, Minnesota
 St. Vincent Township, Kittson County, Minnesota
 St. Vincent Island, Florida

Colleges
 Saint Vincent College in Latrobe, Pennsylvania, United States
 St Vincent College in Gosport, England

Entertainment
 St. Vincent (film), a 2014 comedy film starring Bill Murray
 St. Vincent (album), the eponymous 2014 album by St. Vincent
 The Boys of St. Vincent, a 1993 docudrama film

Health care

 St. Vincent Health, an Indiana-based health care provider
 St. Vincent's HealthCare, a network of hospitals in Jacksonville, Florida
 St. Vincent's Health System, a hospital and specialty clinic operator based in Birmingham, Alabama
 St. Vincent (Indianapolis), a 1983 public artwork in St. Vincent Indianapolis Hospital
 St. Vincent-Ein Kerem, home for physically or mentally disabled children in Jerusalem

Ships
 HMS St Vincent
 HMS St Vincent (1815)
 HMS St Vincent (1908)
 St Vincent-class battleship
 St Vincent (1829), sailed on the Australia Run carrying emigrants or convicts
 St Vincent (clipper ship), 1865 clipper ship renamed the Axel

Other uses
 Battle of Cape St. Vincent (1797)
 St. Vincent (horse), an American Thoroughbred racehorse
 Saint-Vincent, Aosta Valley
 St Vincent's Quarter, an area of Sheffield City Centre, England
 Gulf St Vincent, major inlet of South Australia

See also
 St. Vincent's (disambiguation)
 San Vicente (disambiguation)
 San Vincenzo (disambiguation)
 São Vicente (disambiguation)
 St. Vincent's Hospital (disambiguation)
 Vincent (disambiguation)